Cryptazeca elongata is a species of gastropod in the family Cochlicopidae. It is endemic to Spain.

References

Cryptazeca
Endemic molluscs of the Iberian Peninsula
Endemic fauna of Spain
Gastropods described in 1990
Taxonomy articles created by Polbot